Cozy Tapes Vol. 1: Friends is the debut studio album by hip hop collective ASAP Mob. It was released on October 31, 2016, by ASAP Worldwide, Polo Grounds Music and RCA Records. The album contains verses from each member of the ASAP Mob group such as ASAP Rocky, ASAP Twelvyy, ASAP Ant, ASAP Ferg, ASAP Nast, Playboi Carti and Yung Lord/ASAP Bari. ASAP Mob enlisted the variety of guest appearances from Juicy J, Key!, Wiz Khalifa, BJ the Chicago Kid, Buddy, Skepta, Lil Uzi Vert, Lil Yachty, MadeinTYO, Onyx, Offset, Tyler, The Creator and Yung Gleesh; as well as the album's production was provided by Hector Delgado, alongside several other record producers such as AyoDlo, Crazy Mike, Dun Deal, Lil Awree, DJ Smokey, Plu2o Nash, Maaly Raw and Wavy Wallace.

Cozy Tapes Vol. 1: Friends was supported by four singles: "Yamborghini High" featuring Juicy J, "Crazy Brazy" featuring Key!, "Runner" featuring ASAP Ant and Lil Uzi Vert, and "Telephone Calls" featuring ASAP Rocky, Tyler, The Creator, Playboi Carti and Yung Gleesh. The project was released commercially to its streaming services with a physical CD, and the project also was released three weeks after the album's initial release.

Album cover
The album cover is a baby picture of ASAP Mob founder ASAP Yams, who died on January 18, 2015, at the age of 26.

Singles
The album's lead single, "Yamborghini High" was released on January 16, 2016. The track features a guest appearance from American rapper Juicy J, with production by Hector Delgado. The second single, "Crazy Brazy" was released on October 14, 2016. The track features a guest appearance from American rapper Key!, with production by Wavy Wallace.

The album's third single, "Runner" was released on October 28, 2016. The track features a guest appearance from American rapper Lil Uzi Vert, with production by Maaly Raw. The fourth single, "Telephone Calls" featuring Tyler, The Creator, Playboi Carti and Yung Gleesh, was released on October 28, 2016.

Critical reception 

Cozy Tapes Vol. 1: Friends received generally  positive  reviews from critics. At Metacritic, which assigns a normalized rating out of 100 to reviews from mainstream publications, the album received an average score of 78, based on 4 reviews.

Commercial performance
Cozy Tapes Vol. 1: Friends debuted at number 13 on the US Billboard 200 chart, earning 21,000 album-equivalent units in its first week.

Track listing

Notes
  signifies an additional producer

Sample credits
 "Yamborghini High" contains an interpolation of "North Memphis" performed by Project Pat.
 "Nasty's World" contains samples of "West Savannah" performed by Outkast, "Throw Ya Gunz" performed by Onyx, and "It's a Man's Man's Man's World" performed by James Brown.
 "Put That On My Set" contains samples of "Brother's Gonna Work It Out" performed by Willie Hutch.
 "Telephone Calls" contains samples of "Suspiria" performed by Goblin.

Charts

References

ASAP Mob albums
2016 debut albums
RCA Records albums